Snovi is a band from Pula, Croatia. The music they perform is mainly instrumental and represents a fusion of progressive rock, psychedelic and ambient motifs. They started in 2009 and released their first album in the beginning of 2011. They were formed around 2009 by Marino Bursić on guitar, Branko Crnogorcić on drums, Marko Kalcić on bass and Roberta Paljar on keyboards. In 2011 they launched their self-titled debut on bandcamp, which came also in a set of physical CD copies. After the presentation of the first album and several concerts, the band began recording a new album which was completed in September 2014. The band is currently promoting the new album called "Ciklus".

Discography

Snovi 

Snovi produced and released their first eponymous album, Snovi in the beginning of 2011. "Although band members cited 'King Crimson', 'Mahavishnu Orchestra', 'Pink Floyd', 'Frank Zappa', 'Björk', and 'The Mars Volta' as their main influences, the music of this quartet sounds quite uniquely. Snovi is a hybrid Electro-Organic band that congregates influences of several branches of the Electronic Music and Heavy Progressive Rock, joining delirious guitar playing, pulsing bass lines and machine-gun styled drumming with frantic keyboard-delivered lounge music". The first album was released on 6 February 2011 and can be found on Bandcamp

Track list:

 "Trigon" (0:51)
 "Anima Mundi" (5:31)
 "Ekliptika" (3:27)
 "Chandra" (3:51)
 "Supermarket" (3:42)
 "Virtualni Trubadur" (2:33)
 "Bal Vampira" (4:38)
 "Iluzija" (4:45) 
 "Trailer" (1:43) 
 "Skylla" (7:46)

Ciklus 

The new album Ciklus has been released on 29 September 2014 and can be found on Bandcamp

Track list:

 – Kava Kava, Emanacija, Ishtar (17:03)
 – Dan San, Proton  (8:35)
 – Šapat, Sento de Autuno (10:17) 
 – Trauma, Pust (12:28)

The album contains nine songs which are divided into four parts of the cycle – four movements which are best experienced if listened in succession, from beginning to end (a practice somewhat lost in contemporary culture). Apart from the regular SNOVI instrumentarium (guitar, bass, drums, keyboards), the compositions on this album blend instruments and sounds from all parts of the world : Australia, Tibet, Turkey, India, Central Africa, South America, Ireland, Japan...

Guests: 
Branko Radić (orchestration on Ishtar, Sento de Autuno) 
Samanta Stell (flute solo on Sento de Autuno) 
Edi Premate (synth violin solo on Ishtar) 
Srđa Radulović (mridanga and karatals on Ishtar) 
Tatiana Giorgi (vocals on Trauma) 
Sandro Peročević (contrabass on Šapat) 
Ivan Uravić (kaval and djembe on Dan San) 
Leon Brenko (synth organ solo on Proton) 
Svetlana Radosavljević (gongs on Pust) 
Petra Pletikos (cover drawing) 
Roberta Paljar (cover design)

Reception 
The band received favorable critics so far: "An amazing, original, and greatly promising new band to get addicted to, Snovi is super-highly recommendable for fans of heavy electronica, psychedelic rock, progressive trance, trip hop, neo-folk/ethnical & dark-wave, krautrock, post-metal, and progressive rock lovers in general".

"The atmosphere ranges from aggressive moods to spacious themes and there are even moments, when the band passes into very epic proportions, especially via the exhibition of some impressive choirs.Otherwise the sound is all instrumental with pure energy and passionate musicianship, led by the rhythmic patterns and the contemporary stylings of effects and loops. Impressive and energetic instrumental Prog Rock all the way. A band to keep an eye on. Snovi's debut is a great example of cinematic atmospheres meeting progressive elements and comes warmly recommended".

Karel Witte from DPRP wrote: "If you think you've heard it all, listen to this album. Even from a progressive rock standpoint, this is very adventurous music. While stylistically it is very different from the better known psychedelic (rock) acts, fans of Gong, Shpongle, Ozric Tentacles, Hidria Spacefolk and the likes should find something to enjoy here. If you're looking for real songs, they're not to be found here. For psychonauts only".

References

External links

SNOVI @ Discdogs

Croatian rock music groups